Hadef Saif (Arabic:هادف سيف) (born 17 February 1985) is an Emirati footballer who played in the Arabian Gulf League for Al-Nasr and Emirates Club.

External links

References

Emirati footballers
1985 births
Living people
Al-Nasr SC (Dubai) players
Emirates Club players
UAE First Division League players
UAE Pro League players
Association football defenders